Paul Plunkett may refer to:

 Paul Edward Plunkett (1935–2018), United States District Judge